The 2022 Finnish Cup was the 67th season of the Finnish Cup football competition.

For the first time since 2016, the 2022 tournament will be played as a traditional knockout tournament without group stages. A total of 314 teams participate the competition, a record number since 2009.

KuPS won its second consecutive Cup and the fourth in club history and have qualified for the 2023-24 UEFA Europa Conference League

Calendar

Round 0 
52 teams participate in this round

First round 
232 Teams, including 26 winners from Round 0 participate in this round. Winners proceed to second round. Before the draw teams were divided to 9 regional groups.

Group 1

Group 2

Group 3

Group 4

Group 5

Group 6

Group 7

Group 8

Group 9

Second round 
116 winners from first round participate in this round. Winners advance to third round.

Group 1

Group 2

Group 3

Group 4

Group 5

Group 6

Group 7

Group 8

Third round 
58 winners from second round participate in this round along with the 50 national level clubs from top three tiers that enter the competition at this round. Teams are divided into 4 regional groups and lower-level clubs have home advantage. Winners advance to fourth round.

Group 1

Group 2

Group 3

Group 4

Fourth round 
54 winners from third round participate in this round along with the 2 Veikkausliiga clubs with best performance in league cup. Teams from same club still in competition or clubs with reserve partnership are set against each other from this round onward. Teams are divided into 4 regional groups and lower-level clubs have home advantage. Winners advance to fifth round.

Group 1

Group 2

Group 3

Group 4

Fifth round 
4 remaining Veikkausliiga clubs who participate to European competitions in 2022-23 season, enter this round with 28 winners from fourth round. From this round on draw is nationwide without regional baskets or home advantage for teams in lower divisions. Teams from same club and teams with reserve agreements are placed against each other. Winners advance to round of 16.

Sixth round 
Draw for sixth round will be held on 31 May.

Quarterfinals

Semifinals

Final

References

External links
Official page 
Finland - List of Cup Finals, RSSSF.com

2022
Finnish Cup
Cup 2022-23